Frédéric Schoendoerffer (1962) is a French film director and screenwriter.

Background
Frédéric Schoendoerffer was born on October 3, 1962.  He is the son of Pierre Schoendoerffer  and wife Patricia.   His brother is director, producer, and actor Ludovic Schoendoerffer, and his sister is actress Amélie Schoendoerffer.

Filmography

References

External links 

1962 births
Living people
French film directors
French screenwriters